Shaun Tacey (born 27 November 1974) is a former international speedway rider from England.

Speedway career 
Tacey reached the final of the British Speedway Championship on two occasions in 1999 and 2000. He rode in the top tier of British Speedway from 1992 to 2008, riding for various clubs.

References 

Living people
1974 births
British speedway riders
Bradford Dukes riders
Coventry Bees riders
Eastbourne Eagles riders
Hull Vikings riders
Ipswich Witches riders
Isle of Wight Islanders riders
King's Lynn Stars riders
Lakeside Hammers riders
Mildenhall Fen Tigers riders
Poole Pirates riders
Workington Comets riders
Sportspeople from Norwich